Fy Antenaina Rakotomaharo (born 1999) is a Malagasy chess player. He was awarded the title of International Master by FIDE in 2017.

Career
Rakotomaharo won the Malagasy Chess Championship in 2013 and 2018. In May 2019, he won the FIDE Zone 7.3 zonal, qualifying to play in the Chess World Cup 2019 in September, where he was defeated by Shakhriyar Mamedyarov in the first round. He won the 2020 French university championship held in Nancy.

References

External links
 Fy Antenaina Rakotomaharo chess games at 365Chess.com
 

1999 births
Living people
Chess International Masters
Malagasy chess players